It Takes Time may refer to:

 "It Takes Time" (Anne Murray song), by Anne Murray
 "It Takes Time", by Trippie Redd from A Love Letter to You
 "It Takes Time", by Fleetwood Mac from Extended Play
 "It Takes Time", by The Marshall Tucker Band from Tenth
 "It Takes Time", by Otis Rush
 "It Takes Time", by Patti Smith and Fred "Sonic" Smith from Until the End of the World